Empalactis ponomarenkoae is a moth in the family Gelechiidae. It was described by Ueda in 2012. It is found in Japan (Honshu, Kyushu).

Description
The length of the forewings is 4.5–6 mm for males and 5.5–6 mm for females. The forewings are whitish grey, scattered with pale fuscous and with the costa edged with fuscous from the base to two-thirds. There are three fuscous marks on the costa. The third large and at the middle edged beneath with an orange mark. There is also a large fuscous discal mark before the middle and a large circular fuscous mark on the tornus, mixed with orange. The hindwings are brownish grey.

References

Chelariini
Moths described in 2012